Russell Loris Arlett (January 3, 1899 – May 16, 1964), also known as Buzz Arlett, was an American baseball player, sometimes called "the Babe Ruth of the minor leagues." He was for many decades the all-time minor league home run king in the United States, until being surpassed by Mike Hessman on August 3, 2015. He spent one season with the Philadelphia Phillies of Major League Baseball (MLB).

Early life
Arlett was the youngest of four sons (Alexander, Harry, Leslie "Dick", and Russell) born to German immigrant Beny and his English wife Lillian. He also had a sister Evelyn. During their youth, the Arlett brothers would often play baseball from sunrise till sundown.

Professional career
In 1918, Arlett began his professional career by joining his brother (Alexander "Pop" Arlett) on the staff of the Pacific Coast League's Oakland Oaks as a right-handed spitball pitcher. He received his nickname "Buzz" because he was known to cut through opposing batters like a buzz saw. He won 108 games as a pitcher.

In 1923, Arlett became a full-time outfielder. As a batter, Arlett was the best slugger of the Pacific Coast League, often leading the league in batting statistics and setting several records. In his 13 years in the PCL, Arlett set league records with 251 home runs and 1135 runs batted in (RBIs).

In 1929 (considered to be his best season as a batter), Arlett hit 39 home runs, earned a .374 batting average  and drove in 189 runs. He played only for the Oakland Oaks until the 1930 season.

On January 26, 1931, the Philadelphia Phillies purchased Arlett's contract from Oakland. Arlett played the entire 1931 season for Philadelphia and it was his only MLB season. Already 32 years old, Arlett had an impressive season as a hitter but was regarded as a poor fielder. Although Arlett began his career at about 185 pounds, he had gained approximately 50 pounds during his career and had become a sluggish fielder. He was used in 94 games as an outfielder and only 13 as a first baseman. Although he compiled a .313 batting average and hit 18 home runs — fourth in the National League — his lackluster fielding led the Phillies to use him as a pinch-hitter for much of the season.

In 1932, Philadelphia sold Arlett's contract to the Baltimore Orioles of the International League. Playing for the Orioles in 1932, Arlett twice hit four home runs in a single game. On June 2, 1932, he hit home runs in consecutive at bats against the team from Reading, Pennsylvania. He repeated the feat on July 4, 1932, again against Reading, hitting a grand slam batting right-handed and three more home runs batting left-handed. He led the league that year with 54 home runs and 144 runs batted in. Arlett's record of 54 home runs in 1932 is the second-highest annual total in International League history, and through the 2003 season no International League batter has equalled or surpassed Arlett's 54 home runs.

In 1933, Arlett led the league again with 39 home runs for the Orioles. In 1934, Arlett briefly started the season with the Birmingham Barons and then moved to the Minneapolis Millers of the American Association. During his season with the Millers, he hit 41 home runs that year with 132 runs batted in and earned a .319 batting average.

In 1935, he raised his batting average to .360 hitting 25 home runs and driving in 101 runs. In 1936, Arlett hit .316, but was limited to 193 at bats. In 1937, Arlett played briefly for the Syracuse Chiefs, but then retired. He returned to Minneapolis to settle with his family.

Arlett finished his career as the all-time minor league home run and RBI leader with career totals of 432 home runs and 1786 runs batted in. He now ranks second in both categories among all minor-league players. (He was surpassed by Héctor Espino for home runs and Nick Cullop for RBIs.) In his career as a minor-league player, Arlett earned a .341 batting average and a .604 slugging percentage. Arlett retired with a 108-93 record and a 3.42 earned run average as a minor-league pitcher.

Personal life
In 1927, Arlett married his first wife, Frances. They separated in 1932 and divorced in 1936. They had no children. In court papers, Arlett listed "desertion" as the cause for divorce. In 1936, Arlett married Vivian Johnson, who was secretary to Minneapolis Millers owner Mike Kelly. They had a son and a daughter.

After retiring from baseball, Arlett owned and operated a successful restaurant and bar in Minneapolis called Arlett's Place. Arlett's Place sponsored its own baseball team where Arlett participated as a player until the early 1940s.

Death and legacy
Arlett was inducted into the Pacific Coast League Hall of Fame in 1945.

In 1964, Arlett died of a heart attack in Minneapolis and was interred at Lakewood Cemetery. He was survived by his wife, son, daughter, and his older brothers Harry and Dick. In 1984, the Society for American Baseball Research voted Arlett the most outstanding player in the history of minor league baseball.

References

Further reading

External links
, or Retrosheet
 

1899 births
1964 deaths
Philadelphia Phillies players
Major League Baseball right fielders
Baseball players from California
Oakland Oaks (baseball) players
Baltimore Orioles (IL) players
Birmingham Barons players
Minneapolis Millers (baseball) players
Syracuse Chiefs players
American people of German descent
American people of English descent
Burials at Lakewood Cemetery